Thomas Osmond (or Osgood) Summers (11 October 1812 – 6 May 1882) was an English-born American Methodist theologian, clergyman, hymnist, editor, liturgist and university professor. He is considered one of the most prominent Methodist theologians of the nineteenth century.

Biography

Early life
Thomas Osmond Summers was born the 11 October 1812 in Swanage, Dorset, England. Summers was orphaned at six year old and cared for by his Calvinist grandmother His only sister also died around this time. At age seven, along with his brother, he moved under the care of a great aunt named Sarah Havilland, who had a lasting influence on him. She taught Summers in the doctrine and the practices of the Congregational church, until she died in 1828. Following her death, he was placed in the guardianship of three deacons of the Independent Church who taught him the catechism, selected Bible passages for memorizing, and saw that he attended church five times each Sunday, and at mid-week services. In 1830, he emigrated to the United States. In 1832, he joined Ebenezer Methodist Episcopal Church in Washington, D.C. In 1833, he had a conversion experience. In 1834, he was licensed to preach, and admitted as a member on trial to the Baltimore Conference.

Career
In 1835, Summers was appointed to the Augusta circuit in rural Virginia. He gained a reputation on the circuit as the preeminent experts in hymnody. In 1837, He was ordained deacon in 1837 and was appointed to the Baltimore City station church. In 1839, he was ordained elder and appointed to the West River Circuit in Texas. In 1840, he established a Methodist community on Galveston Island in Texas. In 1844, he moved to the Alabama Conference, and married Miss N. B. Sexton. He also served as a Methodist clergyman in Mississippi.

In 1845, he was elected secretary of the Methodist Episcopal Church. He was selected to chair the committee tasked with creating a new hymnal for the Methodist Episcopal Church, South. He was chosen as the assistant editor of the Southern Christian Advocate, Charleston, South Carolina.

In 1850, he moved to Nashville, Tennessee and worked as a book editor for the Methodist Episcopal Church, South. From 1851 to 1856, he served as the editor of the Sunday School Visitor. In 1855, he relocated to Nashville, as general editor of the Southern Christian Advocate and also supervising all of the Methodist Episcopal Church, South's Sunday School publications. From 1858 to 1861, he served as editor of the Quarterly Review of the Methodist Church, South. From 1868 to 1878, he was the editor of the Nashville Christian Advocate.

Summers published over 500 books from church history to medicine. However, the actual number is difficult to determine because he often did not indicate his own authorship.

In 1875, Summers served as Professor of Systematic Theology at Vanderbilt University, a newly established university in Nashville which was started as a Methodist institution by Holland Nimmons McTyeire (1824-1889), Bishop of the Methodist Episcopal Church, South. By 1878, he became Dean of the Biblical Department at Vanderbilt University, later known as the Vanderbilt University Divinity School. He became known as "one of the leading Methodist theologians of the nineteenth century."

Theology and views
In 1856, a few years before the American Civil War of 1861-1865, and together with William Andrew Smith (1802–1870), the President of his alma mater Randolph–Macon College, he published an essay about domestic slavery in the United States. Later, in The Ladies' Repository, he justified punishment of the sinful as tough love. Throughout the Civil War, Summers continued to publish materials for Confederate soldiers, lamenting once that his poor eyesight prevented him from serving in the Confederate army.

Summers was a systematic theologian in the Wesleyan tradition. His views on soteriology are representative of classical Arminianism.

Death
Summers died after collapsing during a meeting of General Conference on the 6th of May,1882 in Nashville, Tennessee. He is buried in the Bishop’s Grave (also known as Bishop’s Monument) on Vanderbilt’s campus alongside Bishop Joshua Soule, Bishop William McKendree, Bishop Holland Nimmons McTyeire, his wife Amelia, and Chancellor Landon Garland.

Works

Books

Edited by
[Summers' edited books are numerous. Here is only a selection]

Notes and references

Citations

Sources

Further reading

External links
 
 

1812 births
1882 deaths
19th-century American theologians
19th-century Methodist ministers
American Christian theologians
American Methodist clergy
Arminian ministers
Arminian theologians
Bible commentators
English emigrants to the United States
English Methodists
Methodist theologians
People from Nashville, Tennessee
Southern Methodists
Systematic theologians
Vanderbilt University faculty
19th-century American clergy